Events from the year 1762 in Sweden

Incumbents
 Monarch – Adolf Frederick

Events

 
 
 
 22 May - Treaty of Hamburg (1762). Peace between Sweden and Prussia with the mediation of the Queen of Sweden, Louisa Ulrika of Prussia.
 25 August – The first Drottningholm Palace Theatre burns down. 
 
 Elisabeth Christina von Linné publishes her discovery of the Tropaeolum majus.
 Menniskans elände, by Gustaf Fredrik Gyllenborg

Births
 
 
 
 7 October - Fabian von Fersen (1762–1818), official and courtier  (died 1818) 
 
 - Christina Fredenheim, vocalist  (died 1841)

Deaths

 
 

 
 
 
 
 - Charles Langlois, actor and theater director  (died 1692)

References

 
Years of the 18th century in Sweden